Malik Aftab (born 24 June 1982) is a Pakistani first-class cricketer who played for the Karachi cricket team.

References

External links
 

1982 births
Living people
Pakistani cricketers
Karachi cricketers
Defence Housing Authority cricketers
Cricketers from Karachi